Mount Patrick is a massive, largely ice-covered mountain in the Commonwealth Range of Antarctica, rising to  just east of Wedge Face on the east side of the Beardmore Glacier. It was discovered and named by the British Nimrod Expedition of 1907–1909.

Mountains of the Ross Dependency
Dufek Coast